The Haynes's miner bee (Andrena haynesi) is a species of miner bee in the family Andrenidae. Another common name for this species is the Haynes' andrena. It is found in North America.

References

Further reading

 
 

haynesi
Articles created by Qbugbot
Insects described in 1914